Lemi is a municipality in Finland. Lemi may also refer to
Lemi (name)
Lemi, Banmauk, a village in Burma
Lemi, Ethiopia, a city in Ethiopia
LEMI, the ICAO code for Región de Murcia International Airport